Dexter Melvyn Davies (10 April 1951 – 17 March 2018) was an Australian politician.

Davies was born in Kellerberrin, Western Australia, and was a farmer and consultant before entering politics. In 1998, Davies was elected to the Western Australian Legislative Council in a countback as a National Party member for Agricultural. He was defeated in 2001.

His daughter, Mia Davies, also became a member of parliament, and the first woman to lead the WA Nationals.

Davies died, aged 66, from lung cancer on 17 March 2018.

References

1951 births
2018 deaths
National Party of Australia members of the Parliament of Western Australia
Members of the Western Australian Legislative Council
People from Kellerberrin, Western Australia
East Fremantle Football Club players
Australian rules footballers from Western Australia
Australian sportsperson-politicians
Deaths from lung cancer
Deaths from cancer in Western Australia
21st-century Australian politicians